Vladyslav Vasilyevich Tretiak (also spelled Vladislav, born 21 February 1980 in Kiev, in the Ukrainian SSR of the Soviet Union) is a Ukrainian sabre fencer.

Tretiak competed in men's sabre at the 2004 Summer Olympics. He reached the semifinals after defeating teammate Volodymyr Lukashenko, but lost to Hungary's Zsolt Nemcsik. He prevailed over Dmitry Lapkes of Belarus to take the bronze medal.

He finished 3rd in Team Sabre at the 2003 World Championships. At the 2006 World Fencing Championships he won a silver medal in the sabre team event together with Dmytro Boiko, Volodymyr Lukashenko and Oleh Shturbabin.

References

External links
 
  (archive)
 
 
 

1980 births
Fencers at the 2004 Summer Olympics
Living people
Ukrainian male sabre fencers
Olympic fencers of Ukraine
Olympic bronze medalists for Ukraine
Olympic medalists in fencing
Medalists at the 2004 Summer Olympics
Universiade medalists in fencing
Universiade bronze medalists for Ukraine
Medalists at the 2005 Summer Universiade
Sportspeople from Kyiv